William Albert Ackman (born May 11, 1966) is an American billionaire business man and hedge fund manager. He is the founder and CEO of Pershing Square Capital Management, a hedge fund management company. His investment approach makes him an activist investor. , Ackman's net worth was estimated at $3.4 billion by Forbes.

Early life and education
Ackman was raised in Chappaqua, New York, the son of Ronnie I. (née Posner) and Lawrence David Ackman, the former chairman of a New York real estate financing firm, Ackman-Ziff Real Estate Group. He is of Ashkenazi Jewish descent.
In 1988, he received a Bachelor of Arts degree magna cum laude in Social Studies from Harvard College. His thesis was "Scaling the Ivy Wall: the Jewish and Asian American Experience in Harvard Admissions." In 1992, he received an MBA from Harvard Business School.

Career

Gotham Partners
In 1992, Ackman founded the investment firm Gotham Partners with fellow Harvard graduate David P. Berkowitz. The firm made small investments in public companies. In 1995, Ackman partnered with the insurance and real estate firm Leucadia National to bid for Rockefeller Center. Although they did not win the deal, the bid generated interest in Gotham from investors: three years later, Gotham had $500 million in assets under management (AUM). By 2002, Gotham had become entrenched in litigation with various external shareholders who also owned an interest in the companies in which Gotham invested.

In 2002 Ackman researched MBIA in order to challenge Standard & Poor's AAA rating of its bonds. He was charged fees for copying 725,000 pages of statements regarding the financial services company as part of his law firm's compliance with a subpoena. Ackman called for a division between MBIA's structured finance business and its municipal bond insurance business.

He argued that MBIA was legally restricted from trading billions of dollars of credit default swap (CDS) protection that MBIA had sold against various mortgage-backed collateralized debt obligations (CDOs), and was using a second corporation, LaCrosse Financial Products, which MBIA described as an "orphaned transformer." Ackman bought credit default swaps against MBIA corporate debt and sold them for a large profit during the financial crisis of 2007–2008. He reported covering his short position on MBIA on January 16, 2009, according to the 13D filed with the SEC.

In 2003, a feud developed between Ackman and Carl Icahn over a deal involving Hallwood Realty. They agreed to a "shmuck insurance" arrangement, under which, if Icahn were to sell the shares within 3 years and made a profit of 10% or more, he and Ackman would split the proceeds. Icahn paid $80 per share. In April 2004, HRPT Property Trust acquired Hallwood, paying $136.16 per share. Under the terms of the "contract", Icahn owed Ackman and his investors about $4.5 million. Icahn refused to pay. Ackman sued. Eight years later, Icahn was forced to pay the $4.5 million plus 9% interest per year, by court order.

Pershing Square Capital Management
In 2004, with $54 million from his personal funds and from his former business partner Leucadia National, Ackman started Pershing Square Capital Management.

In 2010 Pershing started buying J. C. Penney shares in 2010, paying an average of $22 for 39 million shares or 18% of J.C. Penney's stock. In August 2013, the two-year campaign to transform the department store came to an abrupt end when Ackman stepped down from the board following a disagreement with fellow board members.

In December 2012, Pershing Square Capital Management launched a new closed-end fund called Pershing Square Holdings, which raised $3 billion in an October 2014 IPO on Amsterdam's Euronext stock market. As a closed-end fund valued at $6.7 billion, PSH was designed as a permanent capital vehicle from which investors would not be able to directly withdraw funds. PSH reported 17.1% in returns since inception (Dec. 2012 – November 2017) under Ackman's management, 80% below the S&P 500.

In a statement dated August 27, 2013, Pershing Square reported that it had hired Citigroup to liquidate the 39.1 million shares the firm then owned of the Plano, Texas-based department-store chain at a price of $12.90 per share, resulting in a loss of approximately $500 million. In January 2015, LCH Investments named Ackman one of the world's top 20 hedge fund managers after Pershing Square delivered $4.5 billion in net gains for investors in 2014, bringing the fund's lifetime gains to $11.6 billion since its launch in 2004 through year-end 2014.

On April 27, 2016, Ackman, along with Valeant Pharmaceuticals' outgoing CEO, J. Michael Pearson, and the company's former interim CEO, Howard Schiller, testified before the United States Senate Special Committee on Aging. The testifying panel answered questions related to the committee's concerns about repercussions to patients and the health care system posed by Valeant's business model and controversial pricing practices. Ackman opened his testimony saying, "As a shareholder of Valeant, I recognize my investment was an… endorsement of Valeant’s strategy." Ackman sold his remaining 27.2 million share position in Valeant to the investment bank Jefferies for about $300 million in March 2017. It has been estimated that the total cost of the position, including direct stock purchases and 9.1 million shares that were underlying stock options traded with Nomura Global Financial Products, was $4.6 billion, leading to a substantial loss.

Herbalife short
In December 2012, Ackman issued a research report that was critical of Herbalife's multi-level marketing business model, calling it a pyramid scheme. Ackman disclosed that his hedge fund, Pershing Square Capital Management, sold short the company's shares directly (not with derivatives) starting in May 2012, causing Herbalife's stock price to drop.

A few months after Ackman's initial comments, billionaire investor Carl Icahn challenged Ackman's comment in a public spat on national TV. Shortly thereafter, Icahn bought shares of Herbalife International (HLF). As Icahn continued to buy up HLF shares, the stock price continued to show strength. By May 2013, Icahn owned 16.5% of the company. That number had declined to 6.4% by November 2013.

In 2014, Ackman spent $50 million on a public relations campaign against Herbalife.

Former Rep. Bob Barr (R-GA) called on Congress to investigate Ackman's use of public relations and regulatory pressure in his short campaign, and Harvey Pitt, a former chairman of the U.S. Securities and Exchange Commission (SEC), questioned whether Ackman aimed to move the price rather than spread the truth. In 2014, Senator Ed Markey wrote letters to federal regulators, including the Federal Trade Commission (FTC) and the SEC, demanding they open an investigation into Herbalife's business practices. The day the letters were released, the company's stock dropped 14%. Markey later told the Boston Globe that his staff had not informed him that Ackman stood to benefit financially from his actions and defended the letters as a matter of consumer rights.

In March 2014, the New York Times reported that Ackman had employed tactics to undermine public confidence in Herbalife to lower its stock price, including pressuring state and federal regulators to investigate the company, paying individuals to travel to and participate in rallies against it, and boosting its spending on donations to nonprofit Latino organizations. According to the article, groups such as the Hispanic Federation and the National Consumers League sent federal regulators numerous letters. "Each person contacted by The Times acknowledged in interviews that they wrote the letters after being lobbied by representatives from Pershing Square, or said they did not remember writing the letters at all. Mr. Ackman's team also then started to make payments totaling about $130,000 to some of these groups, including the Hispanic Federation — money he said was being used to help find victims of Herbalife."

By December 2, 2014, stock prices had fallen nearly 50% to $42.08 from their January 8 high of $83.48. Later that month, Pershing Square Capital released a 2005 Herbalife distributor training session, in which an employee described high turnover rates and implied that the company's business model was not sustainable. According to an unnamed source speaking to the New York Post, the video had previously been subpoenaed by federal investigators. In an interview with Bloomberg, Ackman predicted that the company would experience an "implosion" in 2015 or early 2016, citing federal scrutiny and debt.

On March 12, 2015, The Wall Street Journal reported that prosecutors in the Manhattan U.S. attorney's office and the FBI were investigating whether people hired by Ackman "made false statements about Herbalife's business model to regulators and others in order to spur investigations into the company and lower its stock price." In March 2015, U.S. District Judge Dale Fischer, in Los Angeles, California, dismissed a suit filed by Herbalife investors alleging the company is operating an illegal pyramid scheme. In response to Fischer's ruling, Herbalife stock rose approximately 13%. Herbalife and the FTC reached a settlement agreement in July 2016, ending the agency's investigation into the company. On the day of the settlement, Fortune estimated that Ackman lost $500 million.

Ackman's position on Herbalife led to a discussion on live television with Herbalife supporter Carl Icahn for nearly half an hour on CNBC on January 25, 2013. During the segment, Icahn called Ackman "a crybaby in the schoolyard" and claimed that going public with his short position would eventually force Ackman into the "mother of all short squeezes". On November 22, 2013, Ackman admitted on Bloomberg Television that Pershing Square's open short position in Herbalife was "$400 million to $500 million" in the red, but that he wouldn't be squeezed out and would hold the short "to the end of the earth."

In November 2017, Ackman told Reuters that he had covered his short-sell position, but would continue to bet against Herbalife using put options with no more than 3% of Pershing Square's funds.

On February 28, 2018, Ackman exited his near billion-dollar bet against Herbalife after the company's stock price continued to rise.

COVID-19 response
Ahead of the 2020 stock market crash, Ackman hedged Pershing Square's portfolio, investing $27 million to purchase credit protection, insuring the portfolio against steep market losses. Pershing Square first disclosed the hedge on March 3, 2020. According to Reuters, "Ackman said hedging was preferable to selling off his portfolio of companies whose businesses are otherwise strong." The hedge was effective, generating $2.6 billion in less than one month.

On March 18, 2020, in an emotional interview with CNBC, Ackman called upon President Trump for a "30-day shutdown" of the American economy to slow the spread of coronavirus and minimize loss of life and ensuing economic destruction resulting from the shutdown. Ackman warned that without intervention, hotel stocks were “going to zero” and said that America could “end as we know it." He also cautioned U.S. companies to stop stock buyback programs because “hell is coming.”

Ackman later received criticism for actively buying discounted equity stakes in the very companies he was warning could fail; however, Ackman already had realized roughly half of the gains before appearing during the CNBC interview.

In a November 2020 interview, Ackman said that he had grown concerned about COVID-19 because he had seen the film Contagion.

Pershing Square Tontine Holdings
In June 2020, Ackman's Pershing Square Tontine Holdings, Ltd (PSTH), filed $4 billion for the largest-ever blank-check company IPO. In July 2022, Ackman addressed PSTH shareholders saying that he would return the funds of the SPAC as he was "unable to consummate a transaction that both meets our investment criteria and is executable."

Universal Music Group
In July 2021, Pershing Square and its affiliates acquired 7.1% of the share capital of Universal Music Group (UMG) from Vivendi for US$2.8billion, corresponding to an enterprise value of €35billion for 100% of UMG's share capital. On September 9, 2021, Pershing Square and its affiliates acquired 2.9% of the share capital of UMG for US$1.15billion, corresponding to an enterprise value of €35billion for 100% of UMG's share capital. Following the transaction Pershing Square held 10% of UMG's share capital. He was appointed as a non-executive director of UMG on May 12, 2022.

Netflix position
In January 2022, Ackman disclosed that Pershing Square acquired a $1.1 billion stake in Netflix. Netflix stock had just experienced a precipitous 30% selloff after announcement of a disappointing subscriber growth outlook for Q1 2022. In a letter to its investors, Ackman praised Netflix's "best-in-class management team" and said he long admired Netflix CEO Reed Hastings and the "remarkable company he and his team have built."

In April, Netflix stock fell by 35%, and Ackman responded by selling his entire stake in the company.

Investment style

Ackman has said that his most successful investments have always been controversial, and that his first rule of activist investing is to "make a bold call that nobody believes in".

His most notable market plays include shorting MBIA's bonds during the financial crisis of 2007–2008, his proxy fight with Canadian Pacific Railway, and his stakes in the Target Corporation, Valeant Pharmaceuticals, and Chipotle Mexican Grill. From 2012 to 2018, Ackman held a US$1 billion short against the nutrition company Herbalife, a company he has claimed is a pyramid scheme designed as a multi-level marketing firm. His efforts were reported in the documentary film Betting on Zero.

After weak performance in 2015–2018, Ackman told investors in January 2018 that he was going to go back to basics by cutting staff, ending investor visits that were eating into his time, and hunkering down in the office to do research. The next year, Pershing Square returned 58.1%, which Reuters says qualified it as "one of the world’s best performing hedge funds" for 2019.

Ackman has said that he admires short sellers such as Carson Block of Muddy Waters Capital and Andrew Left of Citron Research.

Philanthropy
Ackman has given to charitable causes such as the Center for Jewish History, where he spearheaded a successful effort to retire $30 million in debt, personally contributing $6.8 million. The donation, along with those of Bruce Berkowitz, founder of Fairholme Capital Management, and Joseph Steinberg, president of Leucadia National, were the three largest individual gifts the center has ever received.

Ackman's foundation donated $1.1 million to the Innocence Project in New York City and Centurion Ministries in Princeton, N.J. He is a signatory of The Giving Pledge, committing himself to give away at least 50% of his wealth to charitable causes.

In 2006, Ackman, and then wife Karen, founded the Pershing Square Foundation to support innovation in economic development, education, healthcare, human rights, arts and urban development. The foundation is a major donor to Planned Parenthood. Since its inception, the foundation has committed more than $400 million in grants since 2006. In 2011, the Ackmans were on The Chronicle of Philanthropy'''s "Philanthropy 50" list of the most generous donors.

In July 2014, Challenged Athletes Foundation, which provides sports equipment to those with physical disabilities, honored Ackman at a gala fundraiser at the Waldorf Astoria hotel in New York City for helping raise a record $2.3 million.

On March 15, 2021, he announced that he donated 26.5 million shares in South Korean e-commerce company Coupang, valued at $1.36 billion, to three entities, one of them his own foundation.

In December 2022, Ackman auctioned a luncheon with himself for charity in partnership with the David Lynch Foundation. The proceeds would go toward helping "New York's frontline healthcare workers, police and veterans who battle anxiety, depression, addiction and suicidality every day", with Ackman matching the winning bid to support the foundation. The highest winning bid over prior instances was $210,000.

Ackman is a supporter of Dr. David M. Sabatini, a biologist who was previously fired by the Howard Hughes Medical Institute and resigned from the Whitehead Institute and MIT due to allegations and investigations of sexual misconduct. In March 1, 2022, at a Pershing Square Foundation event, he delivered remarks about Sabatini’s unfair treatment. In February 2023, Ackman announced that the Pershing Square Foundation would fund Dr. Sabatini $25 million ($5 million per year for 5 years) to establish a new laboratory.

 Personal life 
Ackman married Karen Ann Herskovitz, a landscape architect, on July 10, 1994 and they have three children. On December 22, 2016, it was reported that the couple had separated.

As of 2017, Ackman owned a Gulfstream G550 business jet.

In 2018, Ackman became engaged to Dr. Neri Oxman. In January 2019, Oxman and Ackman married at the Central Synagogue in Manhattan, and they had their first child together in spring 2019. In August 2019, Ackman wrote to MIT to discourage them from revealing the $125,000 donation that Jeffrey Epstein made to Oxman’s lab.

Ackman endorsed Michael Bloomberg as a prospective candidate for President of the United States in the 2016 presidential election. He is a longtime donor to Democratic candidates and organizations, including Richard Blumenthal, Chuck Schumer, Robert Menendez, the Democratic National Committee, and the Democratic Senatorial Campaign Committee.

 Books 
 Ackman, Bill with Pershing Square Capital Management (2014). Who Wants to be a Millionaire?References

Further reading

 Richard, Christine. Confidence Game (Wiley, 2010) with Bloomberg News.''

External links

1966 births
Living people
American billionaires
American chief executives of financial services companies
American financial company founders
American financiers
American hedge fund managers
American investors
American money managers
American stock traders
Businesspeople from New York (state)
Canadian Pacific Railway people
Giving Pledgers
21st-century American philanthropists
Harvard Business School alumni
Jewish American philanthropists
People from Chappaqua, New York
Stock and commodity market managers
Philanthropists from New York (state)
Harvard College alumni
People from Westchester County, New York
21st-century American Jews